Teja Sajja (born 23 August 1994) is an Indian actor who mainly works in Telugu films. He started his career in 1998 as child actor in the film Choodalani Vundi. Sajja made his debut as an adult in 2019 with the film Oh! Baby.

Teja's debut as a lead came with the 2021 film Zombie Reddy, which was a commercial success. His other notable films include Ishq (2021) and Adbhutham (2021).

Early life and career
Sajja Teja was born on 23 August 1994 in Hyderabad of present-day Telangana. He did his schooling at The Hyderabad Public School, Begumpet. Sajja entered the film industry at a very young age and has acted in many successful films.

Sajja made his debut as a child artist at the age of two in Chiranjeevi's Choodalani Vundi and acted in about fifty other films alongside leading actors from the Telugu industry. Sajja did other films such as Kalisundam Raa, Indra, Tagore, Yuvaraju, Gangotri, Vasantam, Samba, Chatrapathi, Balu with actors like Venkatesh, Chiranjeevi, Prabhas, Mahesh Babu, Allu Arjun, N. T. Rama Rao Jr. and Pawan Kalyan. Sajja acted a supporting actor in Oh! Baby in 2019.

Sajja made his debut as a lead actor in 2021 with the film Zombie Reddy. The film is the first zombie film in Telugu cinema. The film received positive reviews from critics. He also starred in Ishq: Not a Love Story with Priya Prakash Varrier which got mixed reviews. He completed his first Sci-fi romantic film named Adbhutham alongside Shivani Rajasekhar, the daughter of actors Rajasekhar (actor) and Jeevitha which had a direct OTT release in Hotstar.

He will be next featured in a superhero film Hanu Man, collaborating again with Prasanth Varma.

Filmography

References

External links

Living people
Male actors in Telugu cinema
21st-century Indian male actors
1994 births
Indian male film actors
Indian male child actors
Telugu male actors
Male actors from Hyderabad, India
21st-century Indian male child actors